Countdown is a 2012 Thai thriller film written and directed by Nattawut Poonpiriya. The film was selected as the Thai entry for the Best Foreign Language Film at the 86th Academy Awards, but it was not nominated. The film was remade in 2015 in Kannada as Ringmaster.

Cast
 Pachara Chirathivat as Jack
 Jarinporn Joonkiat as Bee
 Pattarasaya Kreuasuwansri as Pam
 David Asavanond as Jesus
 Lorenzo de Stefano as Fabio

See also
 List of submissions to the 86th Academy Awards for Best Foreign Language Film
 List of Thai submissions for the Academy Award for Best Foreign Language Film

References

External links
 

2012 films
2012 thriller films
Thai-language films
GMM Tai Hub films
Thai thriller films